Rear Admiral Silas Horton Stringham (November 7, 1798 – February 7, 1876) was an officer of the United States Navy who saw active service during the War of 1812, the Second Barbary War, and the Mexican–American War, and who commanded the Atlantic Blockading Squadron at the beginning of the American Civil War.

Born in Middletown, New York, Stringham entered the Navy on November 15, 1809, aged only 11 years old, receiving promotion to the rank of midshipman on June 19, 1810 while serving under Captain John Rodgers in the frigate .

Having received his commission as a lieutenant on December 9, 1814, he was assigned to the brig , Captain Thomas Gamble, which was part of Stephen Decatur's squadron in the Barbary Wars, and helped to take an Algerine frigate. In early 1816, while Spark was at Gibraltar, a French brig, attempting to enter the bay in a heavy gale, capsized. Stringham and six seamen in a small boat, pulled over to the brig, and rescued five of the crew. He attempted to return to Spark, but could make no headway, so turned and pulled for the Algerian shore, but was wrecked in the heavy surf, with one of his crew and two of the Frenchmen drowned.

While Cyane was off the African coast. Captain Edward Trenchard gave Stringham command of a boat in the capturing of four slavers. Trenchard then appointed Stingham prize-master and sent him home with them. In 1821 Stringham was appointed first lieutenant of the brig  in the West Indies Squadron, and from 1825 to 1829 served at the Brooklyn Navy Yard. During the search he was transferred to the sloop , and sent to Cartagena, finally returning to New York in 1830.

Stringham was promoted to commander on March 3, 1831, and for the next five years was engaged on shore duty. Receiving promotion to captain in 1841, he commanded the razee  in the Home Squadron in 1843, then returned to the Brooklyn Navy Yard, serving as commandant in 1845–46.

In late 1846 he was placed in command of the ship of the line , and during the Mexican–American War took part in the bombardment of Vera Cruz as it was besieged by troops under General Winfield Scott. For a short time afterwards he commanded the Brazil Squadron, but in 1851 took charge of the Gosport Navy Yard. Between 1852 and 1855 he commanded the Mediterranean Squadron, his flagship being the frigate . He then returned to Gosport, where he remained till 1859.

On the outbreak of the Civil War in April 1861, he was appointed Flag officer of the Atlantic Blockading Squadron. In August he was sent with troops under General Benjamin F. Butler, to capture two coastal forts near Cape Hatteras. In the ensuing battle, the fortifications were captured without loss, though not without some difficulty owing to the weather, and the fleet returned to Fort Monroe to general acclaim. However this soon give way to criticism of Stringham for not taking his ships closer in, and continuing to attack along the coast. The fact that his ships drew too much water to enter the shallow coastal waters, and that he had been directly ordered to return immediately, eventually emerged, but apparently too late to soothe his irritation, as the next month, at his own request, he was relieved of his command. As some small compensation on August 1, 1862 he was promoted to the rank of rear admiral on the retired list.

Though no longer on active duty, Stringham served as commandant of the Boston Navy Yard, 1864–66, and as port admiral of New York in 1870.

Rear Admiral Stringham died in Brooklyn, New York, and was buried at Green-Wood Cemetery, Brooklyn.

Two Navy ships have been named  in his honor.

See also

References

External links
 

1798 births
1876 deaths
Burials at Green-Wood Cemetery
United States Navy admirals
Union Navy admirals
People of New York (state) in the American Civil War
People from Middletown, Orange County, New York